The Minister of Foreign Affairs, International Business and International Cooperation of the Republic of Suriname is a government minister in charge of the Ministry of Foreign Affairs, International Business and International Cooperation of Suriname, responsible for conducting foreign relations of the country.

List of ministers
The following is a list of foreign ministers of Suriname since its founding in 1975:

See also
 List of diplomatic missions of Suriname
 Foreign relations of Suriname
 Politics of Suriname

Notes

References

Foreign Ministers
Foreign ministers
Suriname